Sixteen Days / Gathering Dust is an EP released in 1983 by This Mortal Coil, a supergroup assembled by Ivo Watts-Russell for his record label, 4AD.

Watts-Russell had signed Modern English in 1980. A few years later, he asked them to record a medley of two of their early songs, "Sixteen Days" and "Gathering Dust". The band had been performing these particular songs together at the conclusion of their live sets. When the band declined, Watts-Russell decided to assemble a group of musicians to record the medley instead. He chose members of Cocteau Twins, Colourbox, and Modern English itself, along with vocalist Gordon Sharp of Cindytalk.

Elizabeth Fraser and Robin Guthrie of the Cocteau Twins recorded the B-side, a cover of Tim Buckley's "Song to the Siren".  Watts-Russell was so pleased with the track that he made "Siren" the A-side of the 7-inch release. At the same time, he was unhappy with the "Sixteen Days / Gathering Dust" medley, and did not reissue it until 2006, when it was included on a 4AD compilation EP that was only available through the iTunes Music Store. 4AD reissued it again in 2011 (this time remastered), as part of This Mortal Coil's eponymous box set. The track appears on the set's fourth and final disc, Dust & Guitars, which is a compilation of all the band's singles. After the box set sold out, 4AD reissued Dust & Guitars as a standalone album in 2012.

Track listing

12" EP version
Side One
"Sixteen Days/Gathering Dust" (9:07)

Side Two
"Song to the Siren" (3:30)
"Sixteen Days Reprise" (4:10)

7" single version
Side One
"Song to the Siren" (3:30)

Side Two
"Sixteen Days Reprise" (4:10)

References

1983 debut EPs
Albums produced by John Fryer (producer)
4AD EPs